Gymnothorax eurygnathos is a moray eel found in the eastern central Pacific Ocean, around the Gulf of California. It was first named by Eugenia B. Böhlke in 2001.

References

External links
 Gymnothorax eurygnathos, a new moray from the Gulf of California (Anguilliformes: Muraenidae).

eurygnathos
Fish described in 2001